Ulises de Jesús Tavares Reynoso (born 29 April 1993) is a Mexican professional footballer who plays as a forward.

Club career

Sonsonate
Tavares signed with Sonsonate of the Salvadoran Primera División for the Apertura 2018 tournament. Sonsonate finished in eleventh position in the league table with 18 points. He left the club in December 2018.

References

External links
 
 
  Ulises Tavares at La Equida
 

1993 births
Living people
Mexican footballers
Mexican expatriate footballers
Association football forwards
La Equidad footballers
Patriotas Boyacá footballers
Irapuato F.C. footballers
Saltillo F.C. footballers
Liga Premier de México players
Tercera División de México players
Categoría Primera A players
Mexican expatriate sportspeople in Colombia
Expatriate footballers in Colombia
Footballers from Jalisco
People from Tepatitlán